Mark Willis (born 3 May 1976 in Narrabri, NSW, Australia) is an Australian Grand Prix motorcycle road racer.

Career
In 1991 Willis won the NSW championship in Australia. He later became the Australian Long Track Champion in 1993 and 'Australian Rider of the Year' in 1996.

He participated in the Australian Superbike Championship in 1997 with the Factory Suzuki Superbike team, Troy Bayliss was his teammate.  Willis took his first race win in the wet at Eastern Creek and finished 4th in the championship.

In 1998 Willis was a wildcard ride in the Superbike World Championship at Phillip Island saw Willis finish 6th in Race 1 and 9th in Race 2. This was on a private Suzuki, all the more impressive as he beat both factory Suzuki riders along with many of the other WSB regulars. He competed in both the Australian Superbike and Supersport until injury sidelined him for the final two rounds of both. He was then offered a wildcard ride in the Australian 500 GP as Phillip Island.  He finished in a point scoring 14th place.

Willis joined the BSL race team in 1999 to compete in the 500 GP World Championship. The bike suffered persistent mechanical problems and Willis only competed in one race at Jerez. Willis finished the season on a leased Modenas bike.  He was consistently the fastest of the three Modenas riders, finishing 6 out of the last 7 races.

In 2000 Willis competed in 2 rounds of the Endurance World Championship for the Yamaha Motor France team. Along with French teammates Jean-Marc Delétang and Fabien Foret, he won both the Spa 24 Hour and Bol D’Or 24 Hour races. He finished joint 7th in the Championship. Willis was also still with the BSL team in 500 GPs, but got little track time due to the bikes continuing development problems. He left the team and signed with Kenny Roberts Snr. to compete in 4 of the last 5 rounds of the season aboard the 3 cylinder Modenas.

Willis signed with the Pulse team in 500cc GP, alongside British teammate Jason Vincent in 2001. His best finish was 13th at Mugello, scoring 3 points. The team however withdrew from the series in July due to lack of funding.

Later in 2002 Willis entered one race in the Supersport World Championship for the Dutch Saveko Racing team aboard a Yamaha YZF R6, finished 16th at Sugo. In 2006 he competed in four rounds of the Australian NakedBike Championship finishing 9th in the series on board a BMW K1200R. In 2007 Willis competed in the Australian NakedBike Championship riding a Benelli TNT 1130 Sport.

Career statistics

Grand Prix motorcycle racing

Races by year

Superbike World Championship

Races by year
(key) (Races in bold indicate pole position) (Races in italics indicate fastest lap)

Supersport World Championship

Races by year

External links

1976 births
Living people
Australian motorcycle racers
People from the North West Slopes
500cc World Championship riders
Superbike World Championship riders
Supersport World Championship riders
Sportsmen from New South Wales